Gorky Anisimov (born in 1874, Chardym, Saratov Oblast, Russian Empire – died on 10 December 1937, Saratov, USSR) was a Russian Greek-Catholic priest.

Biography

Gorky Anisimov was born in 1874 in the village of Chardym, Saratov province into a peasant family. He graduated from the three-class school in Saratov, and converted to Catholicism from Orthodoxy more late. In 1922 on the advice of Vladimir Abrikosov he was ordained in Petrograd by Archbishop Jan Cieplak a priest of the Byzantine rite. He lived with his family in Saratov, worked as an accountant. In 1928 and 1929 met in Moscow with Bishop Pius Neve, received money from him to transfer convicted priests. On 14 April 1931 Anisimov was arrested in Saratov on charges of anti-Soviet propaganda. During the investigation, the charge of "anti-Soviet agitation" was not proved, and on December 16 the same year was released. In 1934 he retired and continued to perform secret religious services in his apartment. Arrested again at the end of 1937 in Saratov, Anisimov was accused of belonging to the German intelligence agencies and anti-Soviet agitation defeatist character. On December 8 he was sentenced to capital punishment, and on 10 December 1937 Anisimov was shot in the Saratov prison.

External links
 http://www.catholic.ru/modules.php?name=Encyclopedia&op=content&tid=5768

Converts to Eastern Catholicism from Eastern Orthodoxy
Russian Eastern Catholics
Former Russian Orthodox Christians
1874 births
1937 deaths
People from Saratov Oblast
Russian people executed by the Soviet Union
20th-century Roman Catholic martyrs